Holmes Chapel is a large village and civil parish in the unitary authority area of Cheshire East and the ceremonial county of Cheshire, England. Until 1974 the parish was known as Church Hulme.

The population of the village was recorded as 5,605 as of the 2011 census. It has however grown due to a number of large housing developments. According to the Index of Deprivation, the village ranks as the 18th least deprived ward in the United Kingdom (out of 8,414). Holmes Chapel railway station has services to Manchester and Crewe, making the village convenient for commuters.

The village has a number of public houses. There is a major supermarket (Aldi), several smaller supermarkets, a precinct, and numerous outlets including a fish and chip shop, off licence, pizzeria, estate agent, a chemist and a library, and a bakery. The town has one secondary school, Holmes Chapel Comprehensive School, and two primary schools: Holmes Chapel Primary School and Hermitage Primary School. It has a GP Practice on London Road.

Cotton Hall, where John Cotton was resident in 1400, remained the family seat until the 18th century when Daniel Cotton married into the Booths of Twemlow; a cadet branch of the family were created baronets and then Viscounts Combermere. Cotton Hall dates from at least the 15th century with some additions in the 17th, 19th and 20th centuries. A farm and estate, just off Middlewich Road, Cotton Hall is today listed Grade II* under the Planning (Listed Buildings and Conservation Areas) Act 1990, as amended, for its special architectural or historic interest.

Geography
Holmes Chapel, set within the Cheshire Plain, it lies on the mid-reaches of the River Dane as it meanders its way around the north end of the village. The village is within the Unitary Authority district of Cheshire East, and used to be administered by Congleton borough.

Holmes Chapel has been twinned with Bessancourt, France, since 1980.

Points of interest
St Luke's Church was built in about 1430. Originally half-timbered, the brick walls encasing the nave and chancel are later additions. It was designated a Grade I listed building on 14 February 1967.

Notable people
 Major Philip Glazebrook, DSO (1880–1918) businessman and Tory politician, MP for Manchester South 1912-1918.
 Harry Styles, (born 1994) singer, songwriter,  actor. Former member of boy band One Direction.

Sport 
 Sir Henry Cotton, MBE (1907–1987) professional golfer, won the Open Championship in 1934, 1937 and 1948
 Shirley Strong (born 1958) former athlete, won silver medal at the 1984 Summer Olympics in 100 metres hurdles
 Andy Porter (born 1968) former professional footballer  turned coach and manager,  played 357 times for Port Vale F.C. 
 Seth Johnson, (born 1979) former professional  footballer, 275 pro appearances
 Dean Ashton, (born 1983) former professional footballer, made over 240 appearances
 Ryan Brooke (born 1990) football forward, plays for Curzon Ashton F.C.
 Tom Lowery (born 1997) footballer, plays for Crewe Alexandra F.C.

See also

Listed buildings in Holmes Chapel

References

External links

Holmes Chapel Parish Council
Holmes Chapel Partnership
St Luke's Parish Church, Holmes Chapel

Villages in Cheshire
Civil parishes in Cheshire